Jenny Hawkins (born 3 April 1990) is a Welsh rugby union player. She is a PhD student at Cardiff University and the National Botanic Garden of Wales. In 2015, she was selected to represent the Wales squad for the 2015 Women's Six Nations Championship.

References

External links
2014 World Cup Diary

Welsh female rugby union players
1990 births
Rugby union players from Carmarthen
Wales international rugby union players
Welsh rugby union players
Living people